The third competition weekend of the 2010–11 ISU Speed Skating World Cup was held in the Vikingskipet Olympic Arena in Hamar, Norway, on 27–28 November 2010.

Schedule of events
The schedule of the event is below:

Medal summary

Men's events

Women's events

References

3
Isu World Cup, 2010-11, 3
Sport in Hamar